"Inside Out" is a song by Irish rockabilly singer Imelda May. Written solely by May, the song was released as her sixth single on January 16, 2011 and the third single from her third studio album Mayhem.

Origin and recording
The song was written after the release of May's second studio album, Love Tattoo, which she was promoting on tour at the time of writing. The song was recorded during the Mayhem sessions at Embassy Studios, a sixteen track analogue recording studio in a converted cow shed, near Basingstoke, United Kingdom. A remixed version of the song was available as a bonus track, via digital download, for those who purchased the CD version of Mayhem and registered to May's mailing list.

Release and promotion
"Inside Out" was announced for release on January 7, 2011 by May's record label Decca and on January 16, the digital download version of the single was released. However, the release date for the 7" single was delayed for unconfirmed reasons, however, it was eventually released on January 31.

The song was performed on The Graham Norton Show on January 7. May performed an in-studio session on The Craig Charles Funk and Soul Show on BBC Radio 6 on January 15 in order to promote the single. May was also featured as a guest on The Vanessa Show on Channel 5 on January 28.

Music video
A promotional music video for "Inside Out" (using the remix) was officially released online by Decca on February 8, 2011 on YouTube, however was set to private viewing for unknown reasons. The video was re-released on February 18, 2011. The music video was directed by Lindy Heymann. and features the remixed version of the song and its concept diverge significantly from previous music videos. The lyrics to the song are visually shown on different-coloured backdrops and incorporates segments from the music videos to "Psycho" and "Mayhem." The lyrical backdrop scenes also use film grain and vertical lines, a common feature of early 20th century movies.

A second music video, also set to the remix, is also on YouTube.

Musicians and personnel
The Imelda May Band
Imelda May - vocals, bodhrán
Darrel Higham - guitars
Al Gare - bass, double bass
Stevew Rushton - drums, percussion
Dave Priseman - trumpet, flugel, percussion

Guest musicians
Olly Wilby - clarinet
Andy Wood - trombone

Technical personnel
Imelda May - producer, mixing
Andy Wright - producer, mixing
Gavin Goldberg - producer, mixing
Graham Dominy - engineer
Darrel Highham - mixing
Guy Davie - mastering

Track listing
All songs written by Imelda May.

Digital download
"Inside Out" - 3:28
"Inside Out" (Vs. Blue Jay Gonzalez remix) - 3:13

7" vinyl
"Inside Out" - 3:28
"Inside Out" (Vs. Blue Jay Gonzalez remix) - 3:13

References

2011 singles
Rockabilly songs
Jazz songs
Imelda May songs
2010 songs
Songs written by Imelda May
Music videos directed by Lindy Heymann
Decca Records singles